The 1903 Melbourne Cup was a two-mile handicap horse race which took place on Tuesday, 3 November 1903.

Lord Cardigan died from the effects of the race a few days after his run in the 1904 Melbourne Cup where he ran second.

This year was the forty-third running of the Melbourne Cup.

This is the list of placegetters for the 1903 Melbourne Cup.

See also

 Melbourne Cup
 List of Melbourne Cup winners
 Victoria Racing Club

References

External links
1903 Melbourne Cup footyjumpers.com

1903
Melbourne Cup
Melbourne Cup
20th century in Melbourne
1900s in Melbourne